The 2008 Toronto International Film Festival, (TIFF) was held in Toronto, Ontario, Canada. This 33rd annual festival was from September 4 to September 13, 2008. The opening night gala was the World War I romantic epic Passchendaele from Canadian director Paul Gross.

About the 2008 Festival
The 2008 festival was heavy on Canadian fare as well as featuring prominent indie films and worldwide as well as North American debuts including: Adoration directed by Canada's own Atom Egoyan, Appaloosa the second film from Ed Harris (who directed Pollock), Blindness from screenwriter-director, Fernando Meirelles, Iraq war thriller The Hurt Locker directed by Kathryn Bigelow, and veteran filmmaker Barbet Schroeder's Inju, la bête dans l'ombre. Scheduled is The Loss of a Teardrop Diamond (directed by Jodie Markell), based on a "rediscovered" Tennessee Williams screenplay. TIFF screened 312 films from 64 countries. These include 249 features, most of which were North American and/or world premieres.

Neil Burger (director of The Illusionist) world premiered The Lucky Ones a character study of U.S. soldiers on an unplanned road trip, starring Tim Robbins.

Also featured was Me and Orson Welles helmed by American "slacker" Richard Linklater, the Spike Lee-directed World War II film, Miracle at St. Anna as well as the Jonathan Demme directed film Rachel Getting Married. Other festival highlights are screenwriter Charlie Kaufman's first film, Synecdoche, New York, a slice of experimental filmmaker James Benning's Americana RR was featured in the "Wavelengths" avant-garde showcase, the four-hour-long Steven Soderbergh epic Che (playing in two parts), as well as The Wrestler lensed by Darren Aronofsky. The Brits are also well represented with Happy-Go-Lucky directed by Mike Leigh and Slumdog Millionaire directed by Danny Boyle.

Despite showing fewer films than last year, among the 249 features, 116 are premieres and 61 are first features. Films from as many as 64 countries were screened, with more than 340,000 admissions expected.

"Canadian Open Vault", which always highlights a restored Canadian film, focused on Quebec filmmaker François Girard's 32 Short Films About Glenn Gould made in 1993.

Actors Brad Pitt, Edward Norton, Benicio del Toro, Ethan Hawke, Laura Linney and film directors  Julian Schnabel, Kathryn Bigelow and Steven Soderbergh are among the celebs the festival has invited on its 500-plus guest list, thus completing its lineup.

The festival closed on September 13, 2008 with the North American premiere of Stone of Destiny written and directed by Charles Martin Smith, the true story of four Glasgow university students who try to restore the 300-pound Stone of Scone to its rightful Scottish home.

With the film Fifty Dead Men Walking, Rose McGowan expressed support for the cause of the Irish Republican Army (IRA), with the reports of her comments being released into the media on September 11, 2008. After starring in Fifty Dead Men Walking, she was quoted as saying "I imagine had I grown up in Belfast, I would 100% have been in the IRA. My heart just broke for the cause. Violence is not to be played out daily and provide an answer to problems, but I understand it." Her comments were attacked by the original author Martin McCartlend. McCartland had general objections against the film, but approved of an out of court settlement, believed to be in the region of £20,000 (US$35,000 in summer 2008).

Awards

North American premieres
 Aide-toi et le ciel t'aidera by François Dupeyron
 Adoration by Atom Egoyan
 Appaloosa by Ed Harris
 Un Barrage center le pacifique by Rithy Panh
 Blindness by Fernando Meirelles
 The Brothers Bloom by Rian Johnson
 Un conte de Noël by Arnaud Desplechin
 Disgrace by Steve Jacobs
 Il Divo by Paolo Sorrentino
 The Duchess by Saul Dibb
 Easy Virtue by Stephen Elliott
 Fifty Dead Men Walking by Kari Skogland
 Food, Inc. by Robert Kenner
 Genova by Michael Winterbottom
 Gomorrah by Matteo Garrone
 Good by Vincente Amorim
 The Good, the Bad, the Weird by Kim Jee-woon
 Heaven on Earth by Deepa Mehta
 The Hurt Locker by Kathryn Bigelow
 Is There Anybody There? by John Crowley
 It's Not Me, I Swear! (C'est pas moi, je le jure!) by Philippe Falardeau
 The Loss of a Teardrop Diamond by Jodie Markell
 The Lucky Ones by Neil Burger
 Management by Stephen Belber
 Me and Orson Welles by Richard Linklater
 Miracle at St. Anna by Spike Lee
 Nick & Norah's Infinite Playlist by Peter Sollett
 O' Horten by Bent Hamer
 One Week by Michael McGowan
 The Other Man by Richard Eyre
 Pedro by Nicholas Oceano
 Pride and Glory by Gavin O'Connor
 Rachel Getting Married by Jonathan Demme
 The Secret Life of Bees by Gina Prince-Bythewood
 Stone of Destiny by Charles Martin Smith
 Synecdoche, New York by Charlie Kaufman
 The Wrestler by Darren Aronofsky
 Zack and Miri Make a Porno by Kevin Smith

Special presentations
 Ashes of Time Redux by Wong Kar-wai
 Empty Nest by Daniel Burman
 Every Little Step by James Stern and Adam Del Deo
 La Fille de Monaco by Anne Fontaine
 Kanchivaram by Priyadarshan
 Ghost Town by David Koepp
 Happy-Go-Lucky by Mike Leigh
 I've Loved You So Long by Philippe Claudel
 New York, I Love You
 Religulous by Larry Charles
 RocknRolla by Guy Ritchie
 Unspoken by Fien Troch
 Waltz with Bashir by Ari Folman

Other films to be screened
 $9.99 by Tatia Rosenthal
 Burn After Reading by Coen brothers
 Che by Steven Soderbergh
 The Class by Laurent Cantet
 Daytime Drinking by Young-seok Noh
 Dean Spanley by Toa Fraser
 Gigantic by Matt Aselton
 Hunger by Steve McQueen
 Inju, la bête dans l'ombre by Barbet Schroeder
 Last Stop 174 by Bruno Barreto
 Lovely, Still by Nik Fackler
 Lymelife by Derick Martini and Steve Martini
 Nothing But the Truth by Rod Lurie
 Public Enemy No. One by Jean-François Richet
 Singh Is Kinng by Anees Bazmee
 Slumdog Millionaire by Danny Boyle
 Snow by Aida Begić
 The Stoning of Soraya M. by Cyrus Nowrasteh
 Tulpan by Sergey Dvortsevoy
 Who Do You Love? by Jerry Zaks
 What Doesn't Kill You by Brian Goodman
 Anonyma – Eine Frau in Berlin by Max Färberböck
 A Year in Winter by Caroline Link

Masters program
 24 City by Jia Zhangke
 Adam Resurrected by Paul Schrader
 Everlasting Moments by Jan Troell
 Four Nights With Anna by Jerzy Skolimowski
 Of Time and the City by Terence Davies
 Lorna's Silence by Dardenne brothers
 Three Monkeys by Nuri Bilge Ceylan
 Tokyo Sonata by Kiyoshi Kurosawa

Vanguard and visions
 Afterwards by Gilles Bourdos
 Uncertainty by Scott McGehee and David Siegel
 Universalove by Thomas Woschitz
 Tears For Sale by Uroš Stojanović
  Vinyan by Fabrice du Welz

Midnight Madness
 Acolytes by Jon Hewitt
 The Burrowers by J. T. Petty
 Chocolate by Prachya Pinkaew
 Deadgirl by Marcel Sarmiento and Gadi Harel
 Detroit Metal City by Toshio Lee
 Eden Log by Franck Vestiel
 JCVD by Mabrouk El Mechri
 Martyrs by Pascal Laugier
 Not Quite Hollywood by Mark Hartley
 Sexykiller by Miguel Marti

Sprockets (family fare)
 Bridge to Terabithia by Gábor Csupó
 Disco Worms by Thomas Borch Nielsen
 Krabat by Marco Kreuzpaintner
 Mia and the Migoo (Mia et le Migou) by Jacques-Rémy Girerd
 The Secret of Moonacre by  Gábor Csupó

Wavelengths (avant-garde showcase)
 Behind Me (Derrière moi) by Rafaël Ouellet
 Le Genou d'Artemide by Jean-Marie Straub
 Pontypool by Bruce McDonald
 RR by James Benning
 The Secret History of the Dividing Line by David Gatten
 When It Was Blue by Jennifer Reeves
 Winter by Nathaniel Dorsky
 Sarabande by Nathaniel Dorsky
 Horizontal Boundaries by Pat O' Neill
 Dig by Robert Todd
 Garden/ing by Eriko Sonoda
 Black and White Trypps Number Three by Ben Russell
 Public Domain by Jim Jennings
 Optra Field III-VI by T. Marie
 Refraction Series by Chris Gehman
 Suspension  by Vanessa O' Neill

Contemporary world cinema
 33 Scenes From Life by Małgorzata Szumowska
 Five Dollars a Day by Nigel Cole
 Acne by Federico Veiroj
 The Country Teacher by Bohdan Sláma
 Delta by Kornél Mundruczó
 Fear Me Not by Kristian Levring
 Flame & Citron by Ole Christian Madsen
 El Greco by Yannis Smaragdis
 Knitting by Yin Lichuan
 Linha de Passe by Walter Salles and Daniela Thomas
 Lion's Den by Pablo Trapero
 Lost Song by Rodrigue Jean
 Mommy Is at the Hairdresser's (Maman est chez le coiffeur) by Léa Pool
 Middle of Nowhere by John Stockwell
 Mothers & Daughters by Carl Bessai
 My Mother, My Bride and I by Hans Steinbichler
 The Narrows by François Velle
 A No-Hit No-Run Summer (Un été sans point ni coup sûr) by Francis Leclerc
 Patrik, Age 1.5 by Ella Lemhagen
 Pandora's Box by Yeşim Ustaoğlu
 Restless by Amos Kollek
 Revanche by Götz Spielmann
 Skin by Anthony Fabian
 Summer Hours (L'Heure d'été) by Olivier Assayas
 Teza by Haile Gerima
 Three Wise Men by Mika Kaurismäki
 Toronto Stories by David Weaver, Sudz Sutherland, Aaron Woodley and Sook-Yin Lee
 Two-Legged Horse by Samira Makhmalbaf
 White Night Wedding by Baltasar Kormákur

Canada First
Before Tomorrow (Le jour avant le lendemain) by Marie-Hélène Cousineau and Madeline Ivalu
Borderline by Lyne Charlebois
Control Alt Delete by Cameron Labine
Coopers' Camera by Warren P. Sonoda
Down to the Dirt by Justin Simms
Edison and Leo by Neil Burns
Nurse.Fighter.Boy by Charles Officer
Only by Ingrid Veninger and Simon Reynolds
Real Time by Randall Cole
When Life Was Good by Terry Miles

Short Cuts Canada
106 by Candice Day
The Amendment by Kevin Papatie
Beyond the Walls (La Battue) by Guy Édoin
Forty Men for the Yukon by Tony Massil
Green Door by Semi Chellas
Hers at Last by Helen Lee
How Are You? by Susan Coyne and Martha Burns
Next Floor by Denis Villeneuve
Passages by Marie-Josée Saint-Pierre
Pat's First Kiss by Pat Mills
Pudge by Annie Bradley
Spoiled by Sherry White
The Workout by Sami Khan

The Real to Reel (docu program)
 Blind Loves by Juraj Lehotsky
 Examined Life by Astra Taylor
 The Memories of Angels (La mémoire des anges) by Luc Bourdon
 Paris, Not France by Adria Petty
 The Real Shaolin by Alexander Sebastien Lee
 Under Rich Earth by Malcolm Rogge
 7915 KM by Nikolaus Geyrhalter

Canada's Top Ten
TIFF's annual Canada's Top Ten list, its national critics and festival programmers poll of the ten best feature and short films of the year, was released in December 2008.

Feature films
Adoration — Atom Egoyan
Before Tomorrow (Le jour avant le lendemain) — Marie-Hélène Cousineau, Madeline Ivalu
Fifty Dead Men Walking — Kari Skogland
Heaven on Earth — Deepa Mehta
It's Not Me, I Swear! (C'est pas moi, je le jure) — Philippe Falardeau
Lost Song — Rodrigue Jean
Mommy Is at the Hairdresser's (Maman est chez le coiffeur) — Léa Pool 
The Memories of Angels (La Memoire des anges) — Luc Bourdon
The Necessities of Life (Ce qu'il faut pour vivre) — Benoît Pilon
Pontypool — Bruce McDonald

Short films
Beyond the Walls (La Battue) — Guy Édoin
Block B — Chris Chong Chan Fui 
Drux Flux — Theodore Ushev
Ghosts and Gravel Roads — Mike Rollo
Green Door — Semi Chellas
My Name Is Victor Gazon (Mon nom est Victor Gazon) — Patrick Gazé 
Next Floor — Denis Villeneuve
Nikamowin (Song) — Kevin Lee Burton
Passages — Marie-Josée Saint-Pierre 
Princess Margaret Blvd. — Kazik Radwanski

References

External links

 Official Awards Announcement (as archived 18 September 2008)
 Official Film Schedule (ordered by date and time) (as archived 3 September 2008)
 Complete alphabetical list of TIFF 08 films (as archived 3 September 2008)
 TIFFReviews.com – coverage of TIFF '08 with news, reviews, blogs, photos and videos
 Variety, Jul. 23, 2008, "Van Damme's JCVD to hit Toronto", (wavelengths, midnight madness, family fare)
  "TIFF slots 'Appaloosa,' 'Other Man'", Variety, By Michael Jones, July 17, 2008
 "Toronto Unveils Canadian selection" Variety, By Brendan Kelly July 15, 2008
 "Secret Life of Bees' stings Toronto" Variety, Jul. 10, 2008
 "Cannes winners trot to Toronto: Fest unveils first pics in slate" Variety, by Jennie Punter, Jun. 26, 2008
 2008 Toronto International Film Festival at IMDb

2008 in Canadian cinema
2008
2008 film festivals
2008 in Toronto
2008 festivals in North America